The Nicolai Fechin House in Taos, New Mexico, is the historic home of the Russian artist Nicolai Fechin, his wife Alexandra and daughter Eya. After purchasing the house in 1928, he spent several years enlarging and modifying the two-story adobe structure, for instance, enlarging the porch and adding and widening windows to take advantage of the views.  He carved many of the fittings of the house and its furniture, using typical Russian design elements such as "triptych windows and intricately carved doors." The whole reflects a modernist sensibility combined with Russian, Native American and Spanish traditions.

The Fechins divorced in 1933, after which Alexandra stayed at the house until her death in 1983.  Eya returned to Taos in the 1970s and began restoration of the house.  She opened it to visitors beginning in 1981, under the auspices of the Fechin Institute, which she founded in her father's memory.

The house was added to the U.S. National Register of Historic Places on December 31, 1979. After Eya Fechin's death in 2002, the house passed to her daughter and son-in-law.  They sold it to a foundation, which established the house museum and the Taos Art Museum.

See also
Harwood Museum of Art
Millicent Rogers Museum
National Register of Historic Places listings in Taos County, New Mexico
Taos art colony

References

External links

Official Instagram

Adobe buildings and structures in New Mexico
Art museums and galleries in New Mexico
Biographical museums in New Mexico
Buildings and structures in Taos, New Mexico
Historic house museums in New Mexico
Houses completed in 1917
Houses in Taos County, New Mexico
Houses on the National Register of Historic Places in New Mexico
Museums in Taos, New Mexico
National Register of Historic Places in Taos County, New Mexico
1917 establishments in New Mexico
Pueblo Revival architecture in Taos, New Mexico